USS W. L. Messick (SP-322) was a minesweeper that served in the United States Navy from 1917 to 1919.

W. L. Messick was a wooden-hulled, screw steamer built in 1911 at Norfolk, Virginia, by Smith and McCoy. The U.S. Navy purchased her on 7 April 1917 from Joseph H. Bellows of Reedville, Virginia, for World War I service. Commissioned as USS W. L. Messick on the same day and classified as SP-322, she was assigned to the 5th Naval District and served as a minesweeper in the Virginia Capes area for the duration of World War I. She was subsequently decommissioned and sold on 27 August 1919 to her former owner

References

NavSource Online: Section Patrol Craft Photo Archive W. L. Missick (SP 322)

Ships built in Norfolk, Virginia
1911 ships
World War I minesweepers of the United States
Minesweepers of the United States Navy